Sudbury Town may refer to:
Sudbury Town Underground station, a station on London Underground in Sudbury, London
Sudbury Town F.C., a defunct football team from Sudbury, Suffolk, England

See also
Sudbury (disambiguation)